Herman Hammy Geelmuyden (born 22 January 2002) is a Norwegian football striker who plays for Stabæk.

Career

Stabæk
Hailing from Stabekk, played in Stabæk Fotball from childhood. In 2017, Geelmuyden signed his first professional contract with Stabæk. He made his first-team debut in the 2019 Norwegian Football Cup, playing all of Stabæk's four cup matches in that campaign, and also scoring a goal in the second round. He made his league debut in June 2019 against Kristiansund.

PSV
After impressing in a few trials at PSV Eindhoven, Geelmuyden, whose contract with Stabæk expired at the end of 2019, joined the Dutch club in January 2020. Geelmuyden signed a deal until the summer of 2023 and was registered for the club's U19 squad. From the 2020–21 season, he was registered in the U18 squad.

References

2002 births
Living people
Sportspeople from Bærum
Norwegian footballers
Norwegian expatriate footballers
Norway youth international footballers
Stabæk Fotball players
PSV Eindhoven players
Eliteserien players
Norwegian Second Division players
Association football forwards
Association football wingers
Norwegian expatriate sportspeople in the Netherlands
Expatriate footballers in the Netherlands